Forecast is a compilation album by the English electronic music group 808 State, released on 25 May 1993 by ZTT Records, exclusively in Japan. The album contains a collection of B-sides and remixes from the Gorgeous era.

Critical reception

The Calgary Herald wrote that "the beats-per-minute do not lash the body like industrial or heavy-duty techno and elements of New Age infiltrate its club world of synthesizer-driven music."

Original track listing
 "Plan 9 (choki galaxy mix)" – 4:45
 "One In Ten (808 original mix)" – 4:19
 "Reaper Repo (12" mix)" – 8:27
 "Plan 9 (guitars on fire mix)" – 4:45
 "One In Ten (UB40 full instrumental)" – 5:02
 "One In Ten (UB40 vocal)" – 4:03
 "Nbambi (the april showers mix)" – 4:20
 "Femme Deluxe" – 3:22
 "Lemon" – 4:52
 "Purple Dust" – 4:24
 "Olympic '93" (the word mix) – 4:58

References

1993 albums
808 State albums
ZTT Records albums